Luca Maniero is the name of:

Luca Maniero (footballer, born 1995), Italian football goalkeeper
Luca Maniero (footballer, born 1998), Italian football midfielder